The Indian National Kennel Club is a registry of purebred dogs in India. Beyond maintaining its pedigree registry, this kennel club also promotes and sanctions events for purebred dogs, including dog shows and specialty shows.

History
The Indian National Kennel Club was established on 21 March 1957 to promote the love of dogs, and enable proper breeding, rearing and training of dogs.

Current activity and administration
The Indian National Kennel Club is the leading authority on registration of purebreds and maintains the recognized registry. It issues pedigrees for purebreds and litters. It hosts various seminars, workshops, training classes and annual shows across the country, and awards championships to various breeds of dogs.

The president of the Indian National Kennel Club is Maharana Mahipendra Singh of Danta. Mrs. Ratty P. Javeri is the secretary and a founder member of the organization.

Registration
The Indian National Kennel Club registers litters of puppies whose sire and dam have both been registered with either the Indian National Kennel Club or The Kennel Club of India, and dogs which have been imported from other countries. They also registers dogs that are purebred but whose parents do not carry any papers. These dogs are registered as "purebreds with unknown pedigree".

Pedigree papers (certificates) are issued by the Indian National Kennel Club and are continuously appended as the dog keeps winning championships or changes owners. Pedigree papers are important as they provides lineage and keeps peddling of pedigreed dogs at bay.

The most common registered breeds with the Indian National Kennel Club are: Labrador retrievers, golden retrievers, German shepherd dogs, dachshunds, Doberman pinschers and pugs. Along with the common breeds, Indian National Kennel Club also registers Indian pure breeds like the Mudhol hound.

Dog shows
Speciality and general dog shows are conducted by the Indian National Kennel Club all over the country. These shows are generally held from October to May every year. The shows follow procedures and guidelines set by the Indian National Kennel Club.

Dogs are issued challenge certificates and championship certificates. Dogs are awarded points (depending on their breed and temperament) in every dog show and at the end of the year, the dog receiving the most show points receives the Dog of the Year award.

The other awards include Best in Class, Best of Breed, Best in Group, Best in Show.

The Indian National Kennel Club organizes an event in the Prakruti festival in Bhavan's College, Andheri, Mumbai every year on animal petting and dog shows.

Specialty dog shows
In addition to general dog shows, the Indian National Kennel Club also organizes specialty dog shows. For fun and interaction between dogs and humans, Indian National Kennel Club also holds events like fancy dress for dogs. They also arrange doggie dates for dogs which helps the owner to find a suitable mate for their dog.

References

External links 
Official INKC website

Animal welfare organisations based in India
Kennel clubs
1957 establishments in Bombay State